Wolfgang Klocker (born 12 November 1971) is an Austrian ski mountaineer and Non-Commissioned Officer in the rank of a Stabswachtmeister.

Klocker started ski mountaineering in 1997 and competed first in the 2003 Laserzlauf. He has been member of the ASKIMO national team since 2008 and lives in Amlach.

Selected results
 2005:
 5th, Austrian Championship
 2006:
 2nd, Tyrolian Championship
 3rd, Mountain Attack short course
 2007:
 2nd, Tyrolian Championship
 3rd, Mountain Attack short course
 5th, Austrian Championship
 2009:
 4th, European Championship relay race (together with Johann Wieland, Martin Bader and Alexander Fasser)
 2010:
 5th, World Championship relay race (together with Alexander Fasser, Jakob Herrmann and Markus Stock)

Patrouille des Glaciers

 2008: 10th (and 2nd "military international" class ranking), together with Georg Simair and Markus Stock
 2010: 8th ("ISMF men" class ranking), together with Alexander Fasser and Markus Stock

External links
 Wolfgang Klocker at skimountaineering.org

References

1971 births
Living people
Austrian male ski mountaineers
Austrian military patrol (sport) runners